Bartlesville Municipal Airport  is in Osage County, Oklahoma, United States. It is owned by the City of Bartlesville and is one mile northwest of downtown. The National Plan of Integrated Airport Systems for 2011–2015 called it a general aviation facility.

Historical airline service 

Bartlesville received commercial airline service between 1949 and 1974. Continental Airlines operated Douglas DC-3s at the airport from 1949 until 1961. Central Airlines arrived in 1950 flying Beechcraft Bonanzas and later upgrading to Douglas DC-3s and Convair 240s. In 1967 Central merged into the original Frontier Airlines (1950-1986) which flew Convair 580 aircraft. All carriers flew routes to Kansas City and Tulsa while Continental also flew direct to Denver with several stops. Frontier ended service in early 1974 and Bartlesville has not seen scheduled air service since then. Bartlesville is only 40 miles north of Tulsa.

Facilities
The airport covers 430 acres (174 ha) at an elevation of 711 feet (217 m). Its single runway, 17/35, is 6,200 by 100 feet (1,890 x 30 m) concrete.

In the year ending September 23, 2011 the airport had 12,362 aircraft operations, average 33 per day, all general aviation. 37 aircraft were then based at this airport: 92% single-engine and 8% multi-engine.

References

External links 
 Bartlesville Municipal (BVO) at Oklahoma Aeronautics Commission
 Aerial image as of March 1995 from USGS The National Map
 

Airports in Oklahoma
Buildings and structures in Osage County, Oklahoma